Kauri Park is a suburb of North Shore, located in the Auckland metropolitan area in northern New Zealand.

Kauri Park's population was 3,879 at the 2013 New Zealand census, an increase of 111 people since the 2006 census. There were 1,857 males and 2,019 females. Figures have been rounded and may not add up to totals.

Education
Kauri Park School is a coeducational contributing primary (years 1-6) school with a roll of  students as of  The school opened in 1969.

Notes

External links
 Kauri Park School website

Suburbs of Auckland
North Shore, New Zealand
Populated places around the Waitematā Harbour